This article lists the rulers of separate states on the territory of the United Arab Emirates, most of which became its Emirates.

List of rulers of the Emirate of Abu Dhabi

Al Nahyan of Al Abu Falah dynasty

List of rulers of the Emirate of Dubai

Al Maktoum dynasty

List of rulers of the Emirate of Sharjah

Al Qasimi dynasty

List of rulers of the Emirate of Fujairah

Al Sharqi dynasty

List of rulers of the Emirate of Ras Al Khaimah

Al Qasimi dynasty

Throne vacant from August 1900 until 10 July 1921

List of rulers of the Emirate of Umm Al Quwain

Al Mualla dynasty

List of rulers of the Emirate of Ajman

Al Nuaimi dynasty

List of rulers of pre-union regions
These are regions that were once independent but now are affiliated with other emirates.

List of rulers of Dibba
Under a Hakim

Reincorporated into Sharjah 1951

List of rulers of Al Hamriyah
Under a Hakim

Reincorporated into Sharjah 1922 but retained semi-autonomy until the late 1960s.

List of rulers of Al Heera
 Under a Hakim

Reincorporated into Sharjah 1942

List of rulers of Kalba
Under a Hakim

Reincorporated into Sharjah 1952

See also
 List of Sunni Muslim dynasties

Rulers
Rulers
United Arab Emirates